Chess competitions have been in the Universiade in 2011 and 2013 as an optional sport.

Events

Medal winners

Men's individual

Women's individual

Mixed teams

Medal table 
Last updated after the 2013 Summer Universiade

References 
International Chess Federation